The 1997 Molson Indy Vancouver was the 15th round of the 1997 CART season. At that time, the Italian driver Alex Zanardi was the leader of the standings with 39 points in front of the French-Brazilian driver Gil de Ferran.

Starting grid
 Alex Zanardi 54.025 seconds
 Bobby Rahal 54.351 seconds
 Jimmy Vasser 54.386 seconds
 Michael Andretti 54.419 seconds
 Maurício Gugelmin 54.505 seconds
 Bryan Herta 54.542 seconds
 Gil de Ferran 54.553 seconds
 Mark Blundell 54.600 seconds
 Greg Moore 54.614 seconds
 Dario Franchitti 54.655 seconds
 Scott Pruett 54.750 seconds
 Raul Boesel 55.052 seconds
 André Ribeiro 55.090 seconds
 Christian Fittipaldi 55.118 seconds
 Michel Jourdain Jr. 55.183 seconds
 Adrian Fernandez 55.315 seconds
 Paul Tracy 55.535 seconds
 Parker Johnstone 55.635 seconds
 Max Papis 55.930 seconds
 Roberto Moreno 55.962 seconds
 Richie Hearn 56.027 seconds
 Al Unser Jr. 56.028 seconds
 Christian Danner 56.068 seconds
 Juan Manuel Fangio II 56.241 seconds
 P. J. Jones 56.373 seconds
 Hiro Matsushita 58.508 seconds
 Dennis Vitolo 1:02:557
 Gualter Salles No time

Race

First 30 laps
At the start, Dennis Vitolo stalled his engine at turn 3. But he continued in the race. The Penske Racing driver Paul Tracy had a collision with a driver at the chicane. The driver, probably, was André Ribeiro. First caution came out, as Dennis Vitolo had a contact with a tyre wall. P. J. Jones went to the pits at the time of the full course caution. Restart came out very soon, but Michel Jourdain Jr. was spun by Al Unser Jr. in the final corner. But he was back on the field. After 9 laps, the top 6 was: Alex Zanardi, Bobby Rahal, Jimmy Vasser, Maurício Gugelmin, Michael Andretti and Bryan Herta. At lap 16, Zanardi missed the hairpin. When he would come back to the race, his engine had stalled. But he remained in the race, although, lost many positions. At lap 20, P. J. Jones retired due to an engine failure. At lap 26, Vasser took the lead after overtaking Rahal at turn 10.

Lap 31 - Lap 60
At lap 35, Bobby Rahal retired after a transmission failure. At lap 47, Richie Hearn was hit by Michel Jourdain Jr. at turn 10. This caused a full course caution. Restart came out at lap 53. At lap 54, Alex Zanardi hit Bryan Herta at turn 10, and, at the chicane, Scott Pruett had hit the back of the car of Adrian Fernandez, resulting in another caution. Restart came at lap 57.

Lap 61 - Lap 80
Then, Greg Moore had some damages in his right-front suspension at lap 64. At lap 68, Zanardi did an amazing overtaking manoeuvre on Michael Andretti at Turn 3 (The hairpin). Right after this, Andretti suffered problems on his suspension, and retired from the race.

Last 20 laps
With 18 laps to go, Alex Zanardi stalled his engine at the hairpin (Turn 3) again. He came back to the race at 10th place. The top 6 at the following lap was: Bryan Herta, Maurício Gugelmin, Jimmy Vasser, Al Unser Jr., Gil de Ferran and Mark Blundell. With 14 laps to go, Zanardi knocked Herta out at the chicane, right after the hairpin. Despite the collision, Herta did not retire. At the last lap,  Christian Fittipaldi crashed at turn 10 and retired, but was classified 9th.

Final results
 Maurício Gugelmin
 Jimmy Vasser
 Gil de Ferran
 Alex Zanardi
 Al Unser Jr.
 Raul Boesel
 Mark Blundell
 Bryan Herta
 Christian Fittipaldi retired, but was classified
 André Ribeiro +1 lap
 Parker Johnstone +1 lap
 Juan Manuel Fangio II +2 laps
 Dario Franchitti retired, but was classified
 Hiro Matsushita +6 laps
 Roberto Moreno Steering
 Michael Andretti Contact
 Greg Moore Contact
 Scott Pruett Contact
 Adrian Fernandez Contact
 Max Papis Clutch
 Michel Jourdain Jr. Contact
 Richie Hearn Contact
 Christian Danner Engine
 Bobby Rahal Transmission
 P. J. Jones Engine
 Gualter Salles Contact
 Dennis Vitolo Contact
 Paul Tracy Contact

Notes
 After his collision with Bryan Herta, Alex Zanardi was fined after the race.
 This was the last time that CART had run in Vancouver's original track. From 1998, CART had used another track.
 Maurício Gugelmin won for the first and only time in his CART career.
Alex Zanardi took his 10th and final Pole Position in his CART career.

References

Vancouver
Molson Indy Vancouver, 1997
Indy Vancouver
1997 in British Columbia